Vlassenko is a surname. Notable people with the surname include:

Natasha Vlassenko (born 1956), Russian-Australian pianist and teacher
Lev Vlassenko (1928–1996), Soviet pianist and teacher

See also
Vlasenko